Carla Nazih al-Berkashi (born June 1, 1983), known as Yara, is a Lebanese pop singer. She won the music competition broadcast on LBC "Kass el-Nojoum" in 1998 for which she had made a name by singing "Awedak". She was discovered by Lebanese composer Tarek Abou Jaoudeh. Tarek became her producer, and also chose her stage name, "Yara".  Being his protegee, he composed most of her first singles, including "Hob Kbir". Her first album, " Twassa Feyi " released in 2005.
The singer also works as an ambassador for the Lebanese Red Cross.

Personal life
Yara who is a Christian, has one sister and one brother.

She is a supporter of FC Barcelona and a fan of the football player Lionel Messi. During a visit to Spain in October 2016, Yara attended the Manchester vs Barcelona match. Shortly afterwards, Yara was presented with the opportunity to meet with Lionel Messi and other players.

Discography
Albums:
Twassa Feyi (2005)
Enta Menni (2008)
 La'ale' Khalijiya (2009)
Ya 3ayesh Bi 3youni (2014)
Mou Mehtajkom (2016)
M3azzabni L Hawa (2017)
Singles:

 Bala'ab Ala Al Makshouf (2021)

Remixes
 Yara x Douzi x Dj Youcef - Mallet (Harout Zadikian Remix) (2020)

References

External links
Official website
http://lastfm.spiegel.de/music/Yara

1983 births
Living people
21st-century Lebanese women singers
People from Deir el Ahmar
Lebanese pop singers